Government Laboratory High School, Rajshahi is a secondary school in Rajshahi, Bangladesh. It was established in 1969 as the laboratory of Rajshahi Teacher's Training College to establish an ideal school. The founding headmaster was Izharul Haque. Every year a large number of students sit for an admission test, and only a few of these can enter.

The motto of the school is "Enter to Learn, Leave to Serve." The school has an alumni association: ORLABS (Old Rajshahi Laboratorians Society).

History 
The school started with a few rooms at the Teacher's Training College building (commonly known as TT College) at Sepaipara and later moved to its own green premises at Laxmipur. The campus has an H-shaped three-storey building with a playground, flower garden, a two-story residential hostel, gymnasium and headmaster's residence.

The inaugural session of a two-day-long Golden Jubilee (50 years) programme organised by Rajshahi Govt. Laboratory High School (RGLHS) was celebrated on 20 December 2019 on the premises of the school at Laxmipur in Rajshahi.

See also
 Seroil Government High School, Rajshahi
 Rajshahi Collegiate School

References

Educational institutions established in 1969
High schools in Bangladesh
1969 establishments in East Pakistan
Schools in Rajshahi District
Organisations based in Rajshahi
Higher Secondary Education in Rajshahi